The University of the Philippines Baguio (UPB; Filipino: Unibersidad ng Pilipinas Baguio), also referred to as UP in the North or UP Baguio, is a public research university located in Baguio, Philippines. It was established in 1921 through the initiative of UP alumni in Baguio and Benguet and was inaugurated as the UP College of Baguio on April 22, 1961. It was eventually elevated to its present autonomous status as a constituent university on December 2, 2002.

It is the seventh constituent university of the University of the Philippines System and is the university's flag-bearer in Northern Luzon. It is also one of the research institutions in the region through its Cordillera Studies Center, with ethnic and interdisciplinary research as well as for its efforts in conserving the biodiversity and indigenous cultures of the Cordillera Region.

Being a former extension of the UP College of Liberal Arts, UP Baguio mainly specializes in the sciences, arts and humanities. It currently offers 16 academic programs through its three degree-granting units. As of 2019, the Commission on Higher Education (CHED) has accredited three academic programs in the university as Centers of Development, namely in the fields of biology, mathematics, and physics.

History

The university was initially established in 1921 as an extension of the UP College of Liberal Arts, and was originally located in Vigan, Ilocos Sur. In 1938, it was relocated to Baguio as the UP College of Arts and Sciences.

During World War II, the buildings and facilities within the college were largely destroyed, and reestablishment efforts were immediately carried out by UP alumni after the war. After several years since its post-war restoration, the college then became a branch campus of UP Diliman, becoming known as the UP College of Baguio on April 22, 1961.

On December 2, 2002, the university's distinction was affirmed by the elevation of the UP College of Baguio into a constituent university through a unanimous endorsement by the UP Board of Regents (BOR), in which it became officially known as UP Baguio.

Organization and administration 

UP Baguio is governed by the university system's 11-member Board of Regents. Like all other UP campuses, UP Baguio is headed and supervised by a chancellor, who is assisted by two vice chancellors—one for academic affairs and the other for administration. The first chancellor of UP Baguio was Dr. Priscilla Supnet Macasantos, who oversaw the campus' elevation into a constituent university of UP within her term. The current chancellor selected by the Board of Regents is Dr. Corazon L. Abansi, who succeeded Dr. Raymundo Rovillos after his term ended on April 13, 2021.

The University of the Philippines Baguio is an affiliate of the following associations:
 Association of Pacific Rim Universities
 ASEAN University Network
 Association of Southeast Asian Institutions of Higher Learning

Academics

Admissions 

Admission to the university is highly selective. Students who wish to enter the university must first pass the University of the Philippines College Admission Test (UPCAT), which serves as an admission requirement for all constituent units of the university system.

Degree-granting units 
UP Baguio constitutes three colleges as its academic arms, and offers 9 undergraduate degree programs, 6 graduate degree programs, and a pre-baccalaureate certificate program. The colleges are headed by their respective deans, the Institute of Management―which is part of the College of Social Sciences―by a director, and the Human Kinetics Program―which is part of the College of Science―by a coordinator.

The university has been identified by CHED as a Center of Development in biology, mathematics, and physics since 2001.

Gallery

See also
State Universities and Colleges (Philippines)
List of University of the Philippines people
 University of the Philippines Manila
 University of the Philippines Los Banos
 University of the Philippines Cebu
 University of the Philippines Visayas
 University of the Philippines Mindanao

References

External links
University of the Philippines system
University of the Philippines Baguio

Baguio
Universities and colleges in Baguio
Research universities in the Philippines
State universities and colleges in the Philippines
Educational institutions established in 1908
1908 establishments in the Philippines